The 1965–66 Polska Liga Hokejowa season was the 31st season of the Polska Liga Hokejowa, the top level of ice hockey in Poland. 10 teams participated in the league, and Podhale Nowy Targ won the championship.

First round

Final round

External links
 Season on hockeyarchives.info

Polska
Polska Hokej Liga seasons
1965–66 in Polish ice hockey